Sophie Körnerová (1750-1817) was a stage actress. 

She was married to the actor J. Körner. She made her debut in 1766 and was engaged in travelling theater companies, such as the famous company of JJ Bruniana and K. Wahr, and was between 1771 and 1779 engaged at several theatres: in Wiener Neustadt (1771-1772, 1772-1773), Eszterházy Palace (1772-1776), Pressburg (1773-1774, 1774-1775, 1777-1778, 1778-1779), Salzburg (1775-1776), Pest (1776-1777), Kotcích Theater in Prague (1779-1783), Estates Theatre (1783-1784, 1788-1791). She was a famous actor of her time who was viewed by great respect by the critics for her artistic ability, praised for her dramatic training, mimic and voice, and for her ability in studying her roles to be able to portray various roles authentically, which was not a given thing in an epoch where most actors still specialized on a particular type of role.   
Initially often playing ingenue and heroines, she became known for as a tragedienne.

References 

 Starší divadlo v českých zemích do konce 18. století. Osobnosti a díla, ed. A. Jakubcová, Praha: Divadelní ústav – Academia 2007
 http://encyklopedie.idu.cz/index.php/K%C3%B6rnerov%C3%A1,_Sophie

18th-century Bohemian actresses
1750 births
1817 deaths